Octávio Alexandre Leal Barros (born 4 September 1993) known as Tavinho, is a Portuguese footballer who plays for Varzim as a forward.

Football career
On 29 July 2018, Tavinho made his professional debut with Farense in a 2018–19 Taça da Liga match against Estoril Praia.

On 30 June 2021, he moved to Varzim.

References

External links

1993 births
People from Loulé
Living people
Portuguese footballers
Association football forwards
Louletano D.C. players
C.D.R. Quarteirense players
S.C. Farense players
F.C. Vizela players
Varzim S.C. players
Liga Portugal 2 players
Campeonato de Portugal (league) players
Sportspeople from Faro District